Keith Roberts Porter (June 11, 1912 – May 2, 1997) was a Canadian-American cell biologist. He created pioneering biology techniques and research using electron microscopy of cells. Porter also contributed to the development of other experimental methods for cell culture and nuclear transplantation. He was also responsible for naming the endoplasmic reticulum, conducting work on the 9 + 2 microtubule structure in the axoneme of cilia, and coining the term "microtrabecular lattice." In collaborations with other scientists, he contributed to the understanding of cellular structures and concepts such as compartmentalization, flagella, centrioles, fibrin, collagen, T-tubules and sarcoplasmic reticulum. He also introduced microtome cutting

Early life and education
Keith Porter was born in Yarmouth, Nova Scotia, on June 11, 1912, the son of Aaron and Josephine Roberts Porter. He finished his undergraduate program at Acadia University in 1934, and became a graduate student at Harvard University.  At Harvard, he earned a doctorate (Ph.D.) for his work on frog embryo development in 1938. Following this degree, he married Katherine Elizabeth Lingley, a former student at Acadia University. They had one son, Gregory, who died just over one year later. Starting in the early 1940s, he conducted research at The Rockefeller Institute for Medical Research in New York. He eventually became a citizen of the United States in 1947.

Career/research
In 1939, Porter was a research assistant at The Rockefeller Institute for Medical Research under James B. Murphy, a cancer researcher. Porter his early work in Murphy's lab on the effect of carcinogens on embryonic development of rat embryos. Because it was difficult for the these cells to fix properly to the slide, Porter concluded that osmium tetroxide preserved the cells the best. When Porter micro-graphed the first cell, he noticed that only the thin sections could be seen. The nuclei region was a dark blob due to all the internal structures surrounding the nucleus. He needed a higher penetration power to see the thicker portions of the cell. Only small sections of thinly sliced cells were able to be micro-graphed, so Porter turned his attention to developing a way that whole cells could be photographed. In conjunction with Joseph Blum, he designed an ultramicrotome section of specific tissue thickness to allow the electron microscope to penetrate these cells. By 1956, he became a professor and full member at the Rockefeller University.

From 1961 to 1967, Porter returned to Harvard University and was chair of the biology department (1965–1967). Porter's research at Harvard concerned the sarcoplasmic reticulum and T system; he conducted this work in collaboration with Clara Franzini-Amstrong. He then explored the role of microtubules in motility, cell division, and control of cell shape with Lewis Tilney, J. Richard McIntosh, and Ursula Goodenough-Johnson.

In 1968, Porter left to work as chair of the new Department of Molecular, Cellular, and Developmental Biology at the University of Colorado Boulder. Porter spearheaded a laboratory dedicated to a higher voltage (1000 kV) electron microscope that improved the ability to examine the interior of cells by virtue of its high penetrating power. When he retired, at age 70, the university awarded him an honorary degree and renamed "his" building Porter Biosciences.

Porter became a professor at University of Maryland, Baltimore County in 1984 before joining Peachey Lee's laboratory at the University of Pennsylvania in 1988, post-retirement. UMBC's Keith R. Porter Core Imaging Facility is dedicated to Porter.

Porter helped found the American Society for Cell Biology and the Journal of Cell Biology. The Keith R. Porter Endowment for Cell Biology, founded in 1981, supports an annual Keith R. Porter Lecture at the conference of American Society for Cell Biology.

Recognition
In 1970, together with Albert Claude and George E. Palade, Porter was awarded the Louisa Gross Horwitz Prize from Columbia University. Porter's colleagues Albert Claude, Christian de Duve and George E. Palade were awarded a Nobel Prize in 1974 "for describing the structure and function of organelles in biological cells", work that Porter is also well known for. Although Porter is known by many as "The Father of Cell Biology," he never officially won a Nobel Prize for his achievements and contributions to science.

Awards and Honors
1957 elected to the American Academy of Arts and Sciences
1964 Gairdner Foundation International Award
1964 elected to the United States National Academy of Sciences
1970 Louisa Gross Horwitz Prize of Columbia University
1971 Dickson Prize in Science
1971 Paul Ehrlich and Ludwig Darmstaedter Prize
1976 National Medal of Science 
1977 elected to the American Philosophical Society 
1981 E. B. Wilson Medal

References

 Keith Porter biography and images, Image & Video Library of The American Society for Cell Biology

External links
 The Official Site of Louisa Gross Horwitz Prize
 Keith R. Porter Papers (1938–1993) at the University of Colorado at Boulder

American biologists
1912 births
1997 deaths
People from Yarmouth, Nova Scotia
Harvard University alumni
Acadia University alumni
National Medal of Science laureates
20th-century biologists
Canadian emigrants to the United States
Members of the American Philosophical Society